Dougherty Auditorium, also known as Farris Theater, is a historic theatre located at Richmond, Ray County, Missouri.  It was built in 1900–1901, and is a two-story, rectangular brick building measuring 60 feet by 100 feet.  It features a Palladian window of sheet metal above the central entrance with flanking circular windows.  It currently houses a local history museum.

It was added to the National Register of Historic Places in 1979.

References

External links
Farris Theater website
Cinema Treasures

Theatres on the National Register of Historic Places in Missouri
Theatres completed in 1901
Buildings and structures in Ray County, Missouri
National Register of Historic Places in Ray County, Missouri